Tim Griek (1944, Haarlem – 13 February 1988, Ursem) was a Dutch musician and producer. 

Griek played the percussions in the Dutch music group The Jokers, in 1967 renamed to Ekseption.
He left the group in 1968 to become a music producer. Some of the artists he represented were Dimitri van Toren, Jan Akkerman, Brainbox, Elly en Rikkert and André Hazes.

In 1988 Griek drove his car by accident in a river and drowned. André Hazes, who was a good friend of Griek, composed the song "Bedankt mijn vriend" (Thanks to my friend) as a tribute.

Trivia
In 2012 musical Hij Gelooft in Mij (He believes in me), which is actually about the life of André Hazes, the role of Tim Griek is performed by Cees Geel and Rutger de Bekker (alternating). 
In 2015 movie Bloed, zweet & tranen the role of Tim Griek is played by Fedja van Huêt.

References

1944 births
1988 deaths
Dutch percussionists
Dutch record producers
People from Haarlem
Road incident deaths in the Netherlands